Dalem Samprangan was a king of Bali who governed under the suzerainty of the Javanese Majapahit Empire (1293-c. 1527), and belonged to a dynasty of immigrants from Java. The exact dating of his reign is unclear; the sources point at either the second half of the 14th century or the early 16th century.

Reign

According to the 18th-century chronicle Babad Dalem, Dalem Samprangan succeeded his father Sri Aji Kresna Kepakisan who had been established as vassal king by Majapahit after the conquest of Bali in 1343. His residence was Samprangan in the present-day Gianyar regency, to the southeast of the ancient royal seat Bedaulu. The chronicle characterizes him as an incompetent and vain figure. He spent much time on his outward appearance, and let his ministers wait in the council hall for him to show up. This behaviour irritated the grandees of the kingdom. After waiting for hours in vain one morning, one of them, Kubon Klapa, left the palace in anger and looked up Dalem Samprangan's youngest brother Ketut, who was a well-known gambler. He persuaded the prince to take royal titles and offered him his residence in Gelgel, a village in the present-day Klungkung residency, near the south coast. In that way, the Samprangan palace quickly lapsed into obscurity, while Gelgel rose as the political centre of the island under the new king Dalem Ketut. No more is heard in the Babad Dalem about Samprangan which became a minor village immediately to the east of Gianyar.

Conflict with Dalem Tarukan

A complex of legendary texts called Babad Pulasari relate the fortunes of Dalem Samprangan's other brother Dalem Tarukan, who had a residence close to modern Ubud. He fell out with his royal brother which resulted in a series of internecine wars on the island. At length, Dalem Tarukan was defeated, and his descendants were demoted from the Ksatria caste. Certain Balinese texts date the defeat of Tarukan in 1502. This is incompatible with the Babad Dalem, which indicates Dalem Samprangan about one generation after the Majapahit conquest of 1343. The historical background of these persons and events is therefore uncertain.

Place in the list of Balinese rulers

In the central Balinese temple Pura Besakih, the most important shrine is Pura Padharman Dalem Gelgel, which honours a series of six ancient Balinese kings. After Dewa Tegal Besung (often identified as Dalem Ketut), who is accorded a meru (tower-like structure) with 11 roofs, Dewa Samprangan follows with a meru with 9 roofs, in turn followed by Dewa Enggong (Dalem Baturenggong) and three later kings. Dalem Samprangan is also listed as king in the early religious text Usana Bali, as successor of Ken Angrok and predecessor of Dalem Baturenggong. All this complicates the question of his original place in the succession of Balinese rulers.

See also

 History of Bali
 List of monarchs of Bali

References 

Indonesian Hindu monarchs
Monarchs of Bali
History of Bali
Balinese people
14th-century Indonesian people